Thout 27 - Coptic Calendar - Thout 29

The twenty-eighth day of the Coptic month of Thout, the first month of the Coptic year. On a common year, this day corresponds to September 25, of the Julian Calendar, and October 8, of the Gregorian Calendar. This day falls in the Coptic season of Akhet, the season of inundation.

Commemorations

Saints 

 The martyrdom of Saint Abadir and Saint Era-ee, his sister

References 

Days of the Coptic calendar